Leonardo Savicius Raimundo Fioravanti (born 26 November 1992), known as Léo Fioravanti, is a Brazilian professional footballer who plays as a centre back.

References

External links

Léo Fioravanti at playmakerstats.com (English version of ogol.com.br)

1992 births
Living people
Brazilian footballers
Campeonato Brasileiro Série B players
Swiss Challenge League players
First Professional Football League (Bulgaria) players
Clube Atlético Juventus players
Red Bull Bragantino players
Atlético Monte Azul players
FC Chiasso players
Rio Branco Sport Club players
União Recreativa dos Trabalhadores players
Esporte Clube São Bernardo players
Treze Futebol Clube players
Associação Portuguesa de Desportos players
FC Tsarsko Selo Sofia players
Expatriate footballers in Switzerland
Expatriate footballers in Bulgaria
Association football defenders
Footballers from São Paulo